"11 Razones" (Spanish for "11 Reasons") is a song by Spanish singer Aitana. The song was released on December 7, 2020 through Universal Music as the third single of Aitana's sophomore studio album of the same name, released four days later. It was written by Aitana, Mauricio Rengifo and Andrés Torres and produced by the latter two. The song peaked at 15 on the PROMUSICAE singles chart.

Background 
Aitana first announced the release of her second studio album through social media on November 11, revealing the album's tracklist, cover art and release date. Later, on December 4, she teased an upcoming music video. She officially revealed that the tease belonged to the music video filming of "11 Razones", directed by Jean LaFleur, the day after. Aitana later revealed to Los40 that "11 Razones" was the last song she wrote for the album since she began developing the project through the concept of math signs and then recorded the title track after quarantining in Ibiza as the epilogue of the album.

Charts

Certifications

Release history

References 

2020 singles
2020 songs
Aitana (singer) songs
Song recordings produced by Andrés Torres (producer)
Songs written by Andrés Torres (producer)
Songs written by Aitana (singer)
Songs written by Mauricio Rengifo